Faridkot is a Union Council in the Punjab province of Pakistan. It is located in eastern Punjab near to the Indian border, it is situated at 30°22'55N 73°33'15E with an altitude of 156 metres and lies to the north-east of the district capital - Pakpattan.

References

Pakpattan District